El Wak (var. Ceel Waaq) is a divided city on the Somalia-Kenya border.  The Somali portion is located in the southwestern Gedo region of Jubaland state, where it is the seat of one of the region's seven districts.

Etymology
The place name "CeelWaaq" literally translates as "God's well". In the Afro-Asiatic Somali language, the word Ceel means "well" and the word Waaq comes from Waaq, an archaic Somali term for God.

Location
El Wak is situated in the El Wak District. It is bordered by the Bardera and Garbaharey districts on the east, and the Somali-inhabited North Eastern Province to the west.

References

Populated places in Somalia